Roseovarius aquimarinus is a Gram-negative, rod-shaped, non-spore-forming, facultatively anaerobic and motile bacterium from the genus of Roseovarius which has been isolated from seawater  from Jeju Island in Korea.

References

External links
Type strain of Roseovarius aquimarinus at BacDive -  the Bacterial Diversity Metadatabase

Rhodobacteraceae
Bacteria described in 2015